Sharafuyeh (also Romanized as Sharafūyeh, Sharfooyeh, and Sharfūyeh; also known as Shahr-e Fūyeh and Shahr Fūyeh) is a village in Banaruiyeh Rural District, Banaruiyeh District, Larestan County, Fars Province, Iran. At the 2006 census, its population was 2,439, in 561 families.

References 

Populated places in Larestan County